Codex Sinaiticus and Codex Vaticanus, two of the great uncial codices, representatives of the Alexandrian text-type, are considered excellent manuscript witnesses of the text of the New Testament. Most critical editions of the Greek New Testament give precedence to these two chief uncial manuscripts, and the majority of translations are based on their text. Nevertheless, there are many differences between these two manuscripts. According to Dean Burgon: "It is in fact easier to find two consecutive verses in which these two MSS differ the one from the other, than two consecutive verses in which they entirely agree."

According to Herman C. Hoskier, there are, without counting errors of iotacism, 3,036 textual variations between Sinaiticus and Vaticanus in the text of the Gospels alone, enumerated as follows:
Matthew: 656
Mark: 567
Luke: 791
John: 1022

Hoskier noted in his book: "I make a present to Gregory and Souter of the 'provincial' exchange of ως and ωσπερ, παντα and απαντα, ως and ωσει, εναντιον and ενωπιον, εστηκοτων and εστωτων, εαυτου and αυτου, με and εμε, οικιαν and οικον, ετερον and αλλον and αλληλον, πιειν and πειν and πιν, ηυδοκησεν and ευδοκησεν, ευθυς and ευθεως, σπυριδας and σφυριδας, καγω and και εγω, υποκατω and υποποδιον, εαν and αν, απο and υπο, προς αυτους and αυτοις, επι and εις, ινα and οπως."

According to contemporary scholars, these two manuscripts represent two different textual families of the Alexandrian text-type. John has more differences than the other gospels because in Codex Sinaiticus, John 1:1–8:38 and parts of chapters 16 and 21 have early Western Christian writing ancestry.
 
Codex Sinaiticus is designated by siglum א, and Codex Vaticanus by alpha character B. The following represent scribal corrections:
 א* – original text of Codex Sinaiticus before scribal correction(s)
 א1 – first corrector of Codex Sinaiticus
 א2 – second corrector of Codex Sinaiticus
 B* – original text of Codex Vaticanus before scribal correction(s)
 B1 – first corrector of Codex Vaticanus
 B2 – second corrector of Codex Vaticanus

For sigla of other manuscripts, see List of New Testament uncials.

The list of textual variants that follows below is incomplete.

Gospel of Matthew 

1:3
 Ζαρε (Zerah) – B, supported by Papyrus 1
 Ζαρα (Zerah) – Sinaiticus

1:12/13
  γεννα – Β
  εγεννησεν (begot) – א
1:19
  δειγματισαι (put to shame) – א1 Β, supported by Ζ f1
  παραδειγματισαι (to make example) – א*.2 C L W Θ f13 Byz
1:20
  Μαριαν – B L f1 1241
  Μαριαμ – א C D W Z Θ f13 Byz

1:25
  εως (till) – Β
  εως ου (till his) –א

2:12
  εις την χωραν αυτων (into their country) – Β
  εις την εαυτων χωραν (into their own country) – א f1 157 a b g1 vg cop
2:13
  κατ οναρ εφανη – Β 372 copsa
  φαινεται κατ οναρ (appeared in a dream) –א

3:6
  υπ αυτου (by him) – א
  εν τω ιορδανη υπ αυτου –

3:11
  εγω μεν γαρ (I indeed) – א 892
  εγω μεν (I) – Β

3:15
  πρεπον εστιν ημας (it fitting us) – א cop it syr
  πρεπον εστιν ημιν (it fitting for us) – Β

4:8
  δικνυει (showed) – א
  δεικνυσιν (showed) – Β
  εδειξεν (showed) – D 372

4:13
  παραθαλασσαν (by the sea) – א W
  παραθαλασσιαν (by the sea) – B
  παραθαλασσιον (by the sea) – D 372

4:23
  εν τη Γαλιλαια (in Galilee) – א
  εν ολη τη Γαλιλαια (in all Galilee) – B C 157 cop syr eth
  ολην την γαλιλαιαν (all Galilee) – D
4:23b
  διδασκων αυτοις – א
  διδασκων – Β

4:24
  πασαν την Συριαν (whole of Syria) – א 157
  ολην την Συριαν (all Syria) – Β

5:9
  οτι υιοι – א C D 13-124-556
  οτι αυτοι υιοι – B

5:10
  ενεκα – B
  ενεκεν –א

5:18
  εως παντα – B 106
  εως αν παντα –א

5:19
  ος δ’ αν ποιηση και διδαξη, ουτος μεγας κληθησεται εν τη βασιλεια των ουρανων – Β
  omit – א* D W d g2 r2

5:22
  ραχα – א* D W
  ρακα – Β

5:28
  επιθυημσαι – א 236
  επιθυμησαι αυτην – Β W
  επιθυμησαι αυτης – א M Σ

5:28
  εαυτου – Β
  αυτου – א

5:30
  η ολον – א
  και μη ολον – B d k syr cop

5:31
  ερρεθη – א* Κ Π syr copbo
  ερρεθη δε – B

5:37
  εσται – Β Σ 61 68 245 700
  εστω –א

5:39
  εις την δεξιαν σιαγονα – א W Σ 157 892
  σιαγονα σου – B D
  σου σιαγονα – E

5:41
  αγγαρευει – D
  αγγαρευσει – B L M S U Π
  αγγαρευση – א E G K V Δ Σ
  και ος λεγει σοι – syrcur

5:42
  αιτουντι σοι – א* y
  αιτουντι σε – B

5:45
  και βρεχει επι δικαιους και αδικους – B
  omit –א

5:46
  ουχι – B
  οmit – א* copbo syrcur

6:2
  αμην αμην (amen, amen) – א 13
  αμην (amen) – B

6:7
  υποκριται (hypocrites) – Βג  syrcur
  εθνικοι (gentiles) –א

6:8
  ο πατηρ υμων (your Father) –  א* D L W Z Θ 0170 f1 f13 Byz
  ο θεος ο πατηρ υμων (God your Father) – א1 B copsa

6:15
  τα παραπτωματα αυτων – B
  omit – א D f1

6:16
  και οταν δε – א syrcur eth
  οταν δε – Β

6:16
  υποκριται – א
  οι υποκριται – Β

  το προσωπον – 244 א g1 k syrp
  τα προσωπα – B

  αμην γαρ – א, copbo
  αμην – Β

6:18a
  νηστευων τοις ανθροποις – Β
  τοις ανθρωποις νηστευων –א
6:18b
  σου – א Δ syrcur
  omit – Β

6:20
  και κλεπτουσιν – א 1 892 syrcur
  ουδε κλεπτουσιν – Β

6:21
  εκει εσται η καρδια – B copbo
  ουδε κλεπτουσιν – Β syrp

6:22a
  ο οφθαλμος σου – Β
  ο οφθαλμος –א
6:22b
  εαν ουν – B
  εαν –א

6:23
  εαν δε ο οφθαλμος σου πονηρος – א W 33
  εαν δε ο οφθαλμος σου πονηρος η – B cop it
  εαν δε ο οφθαλμος σου η πονηρος – syr

6:25a
  τι φαγητε – א f1 892 a b ff1 k l vg syrc copsa
  τι φαγητε η τι πιητε – B W f13 33
  τι φαγητε τι πιητε – copsa
  τι φαγητε και τι πιητε – L Θ 0233 Byz
6:25b
  υμων – B
  omit – א b

6:32a
  ταυτα γαρ παντα – א N Δ Σ f13 157 892
  παντα γαρ ταυτα – B
  παντα – a b k
6:32b
  ο θεος ο πατηρ υμων – א
  ο πατηρ υμων – א2 28 237
  ο πατηρ υμων ο ουρανιος – B 050
6:32c
  χρητε – B
  χρηζετε –א

6:33
  την βασιλειαν (αυτου) και την δικαιοσυνην αυτου – א g k cop eth
  την δικαιοσυνην και την βασιλειαν αυτου – Β
  την βασιλειαν του θεου και την δικαιοσυνην αυτου – E W Σ Φ 050

7:3
  την δε δοκον την εν τω οφθαλμω – א N Σ 235
  την δε εν τω σω οφθαλμω δοκον – Β 050

7:4a
  λεγεις – א  700 0233
  ερεις – Β
7:4b
  τω αδελφω σου αδελφε – א
  τω αδελφω σου – Β

7:8
  ανοιγεται – Β
  ανοιγησεται –א

7:9
  η τις – Β Ζ
  η τις εστιν –א

7:12
  παντα οσα – א
  παντα ουν – B
  παντα δε – copbo

7:13a
  η πυλη – B אb
  omit – א a b c h k
7:13b
  εισιν – א copsa
  omit – B

7:14
  οτι δε – Β
  οτι – א* X
  τι – B2 אb N W Σ Φ
  και – 209

7:17
  καρπους ποιει καλους – Β cop
  καλους ποιει καρπους – Δ δ
  καρπους καλους ποιει –א

7:18
  ποιειν – א
  ενεγκειν – B

7:21
  τα θελεματα – א
  το θελεμα – Β

7:22
  δαιμονια πολλα – א
  δαιμονια – B

7:25
  ελθαν – B
  ελθον –א

7:27a
  ελθαν – B
  ελθον –א
7:27b
  και επνευσαν οι ανεμοι – Β
  omit –א

7:28
  επι τη διδαχη αυτου οι οχλοι – א
  οι οχλοι επι τη διδαχη αυτου – Β
8:1
  καταβαντος δε αυτου – B C W אb
  και καταβαντος αυτου – Z
  καταβαντι δε αυτω –א*
8:3a
  την χειρα αυτου – א 124
  την χειρα – B
8:3b
  ευθεως – B
  omit – א
8:4a
  ειπεν – א k cop
  λεγει – Β
8:4b
  προσενεγκον – B C
  προσενεγκε –א
8:5
  εκατονταρχης – א W
  εκατονταρχος – Β cop
8:6
  κυριε – B
  omit – א k syrs syrc
8:7a
  λεγει – Β 700
  και λεγει –א
8:7b
  ακολουθει μοι εγω ελθων – א
  εγω ελθων – Β
8:8a
  εκατονταρχης – א
  εκατονταρχος – Β cop
8:8b
  ειπεν – א C 33
  εφη – B
8:10
  παρ ουδενι τοσαυτην πιστιν εν τω Ισραηλ ευρον – Β 4
  παρ ουδενι τοσαυτην πιστιν ευρον – f1
  ουδε εν τω Ισραηλ τοσαυτην πιστιν ευρον –א
8:11
  Ισακ – א
  Ισαακ – Β
8:12
  εξελευσονται – א
  εκβληθησονται – Β
8:13
  και υποστρεψας ο εκατονταρχος εις τον οικον αυτου εν αυτη τη ωρα ευρεν τον παιδα υγιαινοντα – א C E M N U X Σ Φ
  omit – B
8:18
  οχλον – Β
  οχλον πολυν – W
  πολυν οχλον – 12 243 copsa syrcur, sin
  οχλους – א 1 22
  πολλους οχλους – אc C N Σ Φ
  οχλους πολλους – 108
  πολλους – 106

8:22
  ο δε ιησους λεγει – B syrcur
  ο δε λεγει – א 33 b c k q syrs

8:26
  τω ανεμω και τη θαλασση – א f1 f13 22
  τοις ανεμοις και τη θαλασση – Β

8:29
  απολεσαι – א copbo
  βασανισαι – Β copsa

8:34
  ινα – B W
  οπως –א

9:4a
  και ιδων – א C D K L W X Δ Πmg f13 33 892 1009 1010 1071 1216 1230 1242 1253 1365 1646 2148 Byz Lect it vg syrs copbo ethro
  και ειδως – B N Πtxt f1 565 700 1079 1195 1546 ℓ 184, 313, 1627, 1761 syrh goth arm? Eth geo
  και ειδος – ℓ 76
  ιδως – ℓ 547
  ειδως δε – Θ
9:4b
  εγειρε περιπατει – א copsa syr
  εγειρε και περιπατει – Β

9:6a
  εγειρε – Β 372
  εγειρε και – D
  εγερθεις –א
9:6b
  πορευου – א, copsa and copbo used different terms, but every concerned to πορευου
  υπαγε – Β

9:9a
  εκειθεν – Β
  omit – א L 10 71 copbo
9:9b
  λεγει – א copsa
  και λεγει – Β copbo
9:9c
  ηκολουθει – א D f1 21 892
  ηκολουθησεν – B

9:10a
  και ανακειμενου – א
  και εγενετο αυτου ανακειμενου – B
9:10b
  ιδου – א D 892
  και ιδου – Β
9:10c
  ελθοντες – א 243 ℓ 50
  omit – B

9:12
  ιατρων – א
  ιατρου – Β

9:15
  ελευσονται – א*
  omit – B

9:16
  το πληρομα αυτου – Β
  το πληρομα –א

9:17
  ει δει μη – Β 301 copsa
  ει δε μηγε –א
9:18
  ιδου αρχων προσελθων – א 13 157
  ιδου αρχων εις προσελθων – Β
  ιδου αρχων εισελθων – אc C D E M X N W Σ Φ
  ιδου αρχων εις ελθων – Κ S V Δ Π
9:19
  ηκολουθει – א C D 33 41
  ηκολουθεσεν – Β
  ηκολουθησαν – Ε Μ

9:21
  εαν αψομαι – א
  εαν αψομαι μονον – D
  εαν μονον αψομαι – Β

9:22
  ο δε – א D
  ο δε Ιησους – Β

9:24
  ειδοτες οτι απεθανεν – א 61
  omit – B

9:26
  η φημη αυτης – א C N 86 99 238 348
  η φημη αυτου – D
  η φημη αυτη – B

9:27a
  ηκολουθησαν – Β D
  ηκολουθησαν αυτω –א
9:27b
  κραυγαζοντες – א
  κραζοντες – B
9:27c
  υιος – B G U Π
  υιε – א

9:28a
  εισελθοντι δε αυτω – א Ν Σ
  ελθοντι δε – Β
  και ερχεται – D
9:28b
  οι δυο τυφλοι – א D
  οι τυφλοι – B
9:28c
  Ιησους – א copbo
  ο Ιησους – Β
9:28d
  τουτο δυναμαι ποιησαι – Β
  δυναμαι ποιησαι τουτο – C
  δυναμαι υμιν τουτο ποιησαι –א

9:30a
  ηνεωχυησαν – B D N Σ
  ηνοιχθησαν – C
  ανεωχθησαν –א
9:30b
  οι οφθαλμοι – א
  οι οφθαλμοι αυτων – D
  αυτων οι οφθαλμοι – B

9:31
  εν τη γη εκεινη – א
  εν ολη τη γη εκεινη – Β

9:35a
  κηρυσσων – א
  και κηρυσσων – Β
9:35b
  εν τω λαω – א
  omit – B C D S Δ
9:35c
  και ηκολουθεσαω αυτω – א
  και πολλοι ηκολουθεσαω αυτω – L Φ 13 124
  omit – B
10:3
  θαδδαιος – א
  και θαδδαιος – Β 17 124 892 cop
  και λεββαιος – D 122
  και λεββαιος ο επικλ. Θαδδαιος – E N W Σ Φ
  και Θαδδαιος ο επικλ. λεββαιος – f13
10:4a
  καναναιος – Β C D L N 1 22 33 118 892
  κανανιτης – א
10:4b
  ο ιουδας –א  80
  ιουδας – B

10:5a
  λεγων – Β
  omit –א
10:5b
  ελθων – Β
  omit –א

10:7
  οτι – א
  omit – Β

10:9
  μηδε αργυρον – B
  omit – א

10:11
  εν αυτη τις αξιος εστι – א Κ 16 99 243 892
  τις εν αυτη αξιος εστι – Β
  τις αξιος εστι εν αυτη – syrp

10:12
  λεγοντες ειρηνη τω οικω τουτω – א D L W Φ f1 22 99 237 251 ℓ 49
  omit – Β

10:14a
  μη δεξηται – Β
  omit –א

10:14b
  η πολεως η κωμης – א f13 61 892 cop
  η της κωμης – syrp
  η της πολεως – Β
10:14c
  εκ των ποδων υμων – א C 27 33 41 71 157 892
  των ποδων υμων – B

10:15
  γη σοδομων και γη γομορρων – א
  γη σοδομων και γομορρων – Β

10:16a
  εις μεσον – Β
  εν μεσω – א D
10:16b
  ως ο οφις – א
  ως οι οφεις – B
  ωσει οφεις – L 157

10:21
  επαναστησεται τεκνα – Β Δ 75 235 700
  επαναστησονται τεκνα –א

10:23
  Ισραηλ – Β D
  του Ισραηλ – א

10:24
  υπερ τον διδασκαλον αυτου – א F M W
  υπερ του διδασκαλον – Β

10:25a
  ει τω οικοδεσποτη βεελζεβουλ ... τοις οικιακοις – Β
  ει τω οικοδεσποτην βεελζεβουλ ... τοις οικιακους –א
10:25b
  επεκαλεσαντο – א N
  εκαλεσαντω – L
  απεκαλεσαν – U
  επεκαλεσαν – Β
  καλουσιν – D
10:28
  ψυχην και το σωμα – א
  την ψυχην μετα του σωματος – copbo
  ψυχην και σωμα – Β C D L X Π Σ
  σωμα και ψυχην – syrsin
  την ψυχην και το σωμα – E אc W Φ
10:3
  εν τοις ουρανοις – Β C Κ V Σ Φ
  εν ουρανοις – א
10:33a
  οστις δε αρνησηται – Β L
  οστις δ’ αρνησηται – C
  οστις δαν αρνησηται – א
  και οστις αρνησηται – W syrcur
10:33b
  εν τοις ουρανοις – Β V X
  εν ουρανοις –א
10:34
  ειρηνην βαλειν – א
  ειρηνην ηλθον βαλειν – h k vg
  βαλειν ειρηνην – Β
10:37
  και ο φιλων υιον η θυγατερα υπερ εμε ουκ εστιν αξιος – א
  omit – B D
10:40
  ο δε εμε – א
  και ο εμε – Β
11:4
  τω Ιωαννη – א 243
  Ιωαννει – D W Δ
  Ιωαννη – Β
11:8
  ανθρωπον ιδειν – א
  ιδειν ανθρωπον – Β
11:15
  ακουειν – א
  omit – Β D 32 700
11:19
  φιλος τελωνων – א
  τελωνων φιλος – Β
11:21
  εν σακκω και σποδω μετενοησαν – Β
  εν σακκω και σποδω καθημενοι μετενοησαν – א C U
11:23a
  καταβηση – Β D W
  καταβιβασηυση – א
11:23b
  αι εν σοι γενομεναι – B
  αι γενομεναι εν σοι –א
11:24a
  οτι – Β
  omit – א Ν 33
11:24b
  ανεκτοτερον εσται γη σοδομων – א
  γη σοδομων ανεκτοτερον εσται – Β
11:27
  υπο του πατρος – א 71
  υπο του πατρος μου – Β
11:29
  μαθετε – א
  μαθετε απ εμου – Β
12:1
  σαββατοις – Β
  σαββασιν – א W
  εν τοις σαββασιν – W
12:4
  ο – Β D W
  ους –א
12:10
  θεραπευσαι – א D L W 106
  θεραπεθειν – Β
12:11
  πεση – א Γ 238 251 253 892
  εμπεση – Β
12:12
  σαββατοις – Β
  σαββασιν –א
12:13
  ως η αλλη – Β
  omit –א 892
12:17
  ινα – א Β C D 1 33
  οπως – Ε
12:20
  ληνον – Β
  λινον –א
12:22a
  προσηνεγκαν αυτω δαιμονιζομενον τυφλον και κωφον – Β
  προσηνεγκαν αυτω δαιμονιζομενος τυφλος και κωφος –א
12:22b
  εθεραπευσεν αυτους – א
  εθεραπευσεν αυτον – Β
12:29
  αρπασαι – Β C Ν Χ W Σ 892
  διαρπασαι – א D Φ
12:30
  σκορπιζει με – א 33
  σκορπιζει – Β
12:31
  αφεθησεται υμιν τοις ανθρωποις – Β
  αφεθησεται τοις ανθρωποις –א
12:32a
  ουκ αφεθησεται – Β
  αφεθησεται –א
12:32b
  ου μη αφεθη – Β
  ου μη αφεθησεται – א*
  ουκ αφεθησεται – אcorr
12:35
  αγαθα – Β W
  τα αγαθα – א C L U Δ Ν Σ Φ
12:37
  και εκ των λογων – א
  και εκ των λογων σου – Β
  και εκ των λογων εργων σου – Κ
12:38
  τινες των γραμματαιων – Β 59
  τινες των γραμματαιων και φαρισαιων – א
  τινες των φαρισαιων και γραμματαιων – Κ
12:44a
  και ευρισκει – א
  και ελθον ευρισκει – Β
  και ελθων ευρισκει – F G X Γ Σ Φ
12:44b
  και σεσαρωμενον – א C
  σεσαρωμενον – Β
12:46
  ζητουντες αυτω λαλησαι – Sinaiticusa Β C Z
  ζητουντες λαλησαι αυτω – D L Φ
  omit –א
12:48
  αδελφοι – Β
  αδελφοι μου –א
12:49
  την χειραν – א
  την χειρα αυτου – B
13:3
  του σπειραι – א D L Μ Χ Σ Φ
  του σπειρειν – Β
13:4
  και ελθοντα τα πετεινα κατεφαγεν – Β
  και ηλθεν τα πετεινα και κατεφαγεν – א D
13:5
  αλλα ... και ευθεως εξανετειλαν – Β
  αλλα ... και ευθεως εξανετειλεν –א
13:5a
  βαθος της γης – Β
  βατος γης – א
13:6
  εκαυματωθη – Β
  εκαυματισθη –א
13:7
  επνιξαν – א
  ανεπνιξαν – Β
13:10
  αυτοις λαλεις – א
  λαλεις αυτοις – Β
13:14
  ακουσατε ... βλεψετε – Β
  ακουσητε ... βλεψετε – Σ
  ακουσετε ... βλεψητε – א Φ
  ακουσετε ... βλεψετε – C D
  ακουσητε ... βλεψητε – Ε F G M N U V Γ
13:15
  τοις ωσιν αυτων – א C Φ
  τοις ωσιν – Β D
13:17a
  αμην – א Χ Φ
  αμην γαρ – Β
13:17b
  και δικαιοι – א
  omit – B
13:24
  ελαλησεν – Β
  παρεθηκεν א Β2
13:25
  επεσπαρκεν – א 1 13 22
  επεσπειρεν – Β Ν Σ
  εσπειρεν – C D W Φ
13:27
  τα ζιζανια – א L X Σ Φ
  ζιζανια – Β N W
13:28a
  οι δε – Β 157
  οι δε δουλοι – א
13:28b
  αυτω λεγουσιν – Β C
  λεγουσιν αυτω – א D
  ειπον αυτω – Ε N
13:30a
  αχρι – א* L
  εως – Β D
  μεχρι – C אb N Σ
13:30b
  εν τω καιρω – א C E L
  εν καιρω – B D אb N W Σ
13:30c
  αυτας – Β
  αυτα –א
13:30d
  συναγετε – Β Γ 1
  συναγαγετε – א B2
  συνλεγεται – D
13:32
  κατασκηνοιν – Β* D
  κατασκηνουν – א B2
13:33
  ελαλεσεν αυτοις λεγων – א L M U X Θ f13 28
  παρεθηκεν αυτοις λεγων – C 243 1241
  ελαλεσεν αυτοις – Β
  omit – D syrcur, sin d k
13:34
  ελαλησεν – א Δ 61
  ελαλει – Β D אc Σ Φ
  ελαλη – Ε Μ Γ W
13:35a
  δια Ησαιου του προφητου – א 1
  δια του προφητου – Β
13:35b
  απο καταβολης – B אb 1
  απο καταβολης κοσμου – א
  απ αρχης – syrcur, sin
13:36a
  εισηλθεν – א
  ανηλθεν – 273
  απηλθεν – a b h q
  ηλθεν – Β
13:36b
  διασαφησον – א B Θ 0242
  φρασον – אb C D L W 0106 0233 0250 f1 f13 Byz
13:39a
  ο δε εχθρος εστιν ο σπειρας αυτα ο διαβολος – Β
  ο δε εχθρος ο σπειρας αυτα εστιν ο διαβολος – א
  ο δε εχθρος ο σπειρων αυτα εστιν ο διαβολος – L
  ο δε εχθρος ο σπειρας εστιν ο διαβολος – D
13:39b
  ο δε θερισμος συντελεια αιωνος εστιν – Β
  omit –א
13:41
  τους αγγελους – א F
  τους αγγελους αυτου – Β
13:42
  βαλλουσιν – א D Χ
  βαλουσιν – Β
13:44a
  εν τω αγρω – Β אα
  omit –א
13:44b
  πωλει οσα εχει – Β 28 61 435
  πωλει παντα οσα εχει –א
13:48
  εβαλλον – א V Δ
  εξεβαλλον – Χ
  εβαλον – Β
13:50
  βαλλουσιν – א D Χ
  εκβαλυσιν – 258
  βαλουσιν – Β
13:54
  εις την αντιπατριδα αυτου – א
  εις την πατριδα αυτου – rest of mss
13:55
  Ιωαννης – א* D E F G M S U V X Φ
  Ιωσηφ – אa B C N Σ
  Ιωσης – K L W Δ Π Φ
  Ιωση – copbo
13:57a
  ο δε Ιησους – Β
  omit –א
13:57 b
  εν τη πατριδι – Β D
  εν τη ιδια πατριδι – א Ζ f13 892
  εν τη πατριδι αυτου – E G K M N S V Γ Δ Σ Φ L X W
14:1
  τετρααρχης – א C Z Δ
  τετραρχης – Β D
14:2
  δια τουτο – א
  omit – Β
14:3
  τοτε κρατησας – Β
  κρατησας –א
14:4a
  Ιωαννης – א D
  ο Ιωαννης – Β
14:4b
  αυτω – Β 24 28
  omit –א
14:5
  επει – Β
  επειδη – Ν Σ
  οτι –א
14:7
  μετα ορκου – א
  μεθορκου – Β
14:9
  λυπηθεις ο βασιλευς δια τους ορκους – Β D
  ελυπηθη ο βασιλευς δια δε τους ορκους –א
14:12
  αυτου – א D L Σ
  omit – Β
14:13
  πεζοι – א L Ζ 245
  πεζη – Β
14:15a
  παρηλθεν ηδη – א Ζ 1
  ηδη παρηλθεν – Β D
  παρηλθεν – copsa copbo arm syr
14:15b
  απολυσον ουν – א C Z
  ιδου απολυσον – eth
  και απολυσον – k
  απολυσον – Β
14:15c
  χωρας – א
  πολεις – 238
  κωμας – Β
14:16
  ο δε – א D 61
  ο δε Ιησους – Β
14:17
  αρτους ει μη πεντε – א
  ει μη πεντε αρτους – Β
14:19a
  κελευσατε – Β
  εκελευσεν – א Ζ
  κελευσας – Β2 D
14:19b
  λαβων – Β C2 E F G
  ελαβεν – D
  και ελαβεν – א C L X
14:22a
  και ευθεως – Β
  και – א C 892
14:22b
  τους μαθητας – א C D
  τους μαθητας αυτου – Β Ε F Κ P X Π Σ
14:22c
  πλοιον – Β Σ 1 33 99 124 700 892
  το πλοιον –א
14:23
  απολυσας τους οχλους – Β
  omit –251א
14:24
  σταδιους πολλους απο της γης απειχε βασανιζομενον – Β f13
  μενον της θαλασσης ην βασανιζομενον –א
14:26
  οι δε μαθηται ιδοντες αυτον – א1 Β D f13 pc
  ιδοντες δε αυτον – א* Θ 700 pc copsa
  και ιδοντες αυτον – 084 f1 1241 1424 pc copbo pt
  και ιδοντες αυτον οι μαθηται – C L W 0106 Byz syrh copbo pt
14:28a
  ο πετρος ειπεν αυτω – Β
  ο πετρος αυτω ειπεν – 33
  αυτω ο πετρος ειπεν –א
14:28b
  ει συ ει κυριε – א 892
  ει συ ει – syrsin
  κυριε ει συ ει – Β
14:29
  ελθιν ηλθεν ουν προς τον ΙΝ – א*
  ηλθεν προς ΙΝ – copsa
  και θλθεν προς τον ΙΝ – Β C 700
  θλθεν προς τον ΙΝ – אc C2 D copbo
14:35
  του τοπου εκεινου – Β
  του τοπου –א
14:36
  παρεκαλουν – Β 892
  παρεκαλουν αυτον –א
15:3
  διατι υμεις – א
  διατι και υμεις – Β
15:4
  ειπεν (see Mark 7:10) – אa B D Θ 084 f1 f13 700 892 ita, aur, b, c, d, e, ff1, ff2, g1, l q vg syrc, s, p copsa, bo, fay arm eth geo
  ενετειλατο λεγων – א*, b C K L W X Δ Π 0106 33 565 1010 1071 1230 1241 1253 1344 1365 2174 Byz
15:5
  ωφεληθης ουδεν εστιν – א
  ωφεληθης – Β
15:6
  τον νομον – א C f13
  τον λογον – Β D 892
  την εντολην – Ε F G N W Σ Φ
15:11a
  ερχομενον – Β
  εισερχομενον –א
15:11b
  τουτο κοινοι τον ανον – א cop
  κοινοι τον ανον – Β
  κοινωνει τον ανον – D
15:12
  λεγουσιν – Β D
  λεγοντες – copsa
  ειπαν – א
  ειπον – C
15:14
  τυφλοι εισιν οδηγοι – Β D L Z
  οδηγοι τυφλοι – 253
  οδηγοι εισιν τυφλοι – א C
15:15
  αυτω ειπεν – Β
  ειπεν αυτω – א
  ειπεν – W
15:17
  ου νοειτε – Β D Ζ Θ 33 238 f13
  ετι ου νοειτε –
  ουπω νοειτε – א C L W 0119 f1 Byz
15:17
  εισερχομενον – Β Θ 381
  εισπορευομενον – א
15:17
  εις τον αφεδρωνα – א Γ 99 253 892
  εις αφεδρωνα – B
15:22
  εκραξεν – א* Ζ f13 892
  εκραζεν – Β D Σ אc
  εκραυγαζεν – M 299
  εκραυγασεν – C (εκραυγασεν 4)
15:22
  κυριε υιος – B D Θ 56 58 700
  κυριε υιε – א
15:27
  και τα κυναρια – B
  και γαρ τα κυναρια – א
15:30
  different order
15:31
  τον οχλον – C D U Δgr Φ Θ
  τους οχλους – B
15:31
  κωφους ακουοντας – B Φ 59 115 238
  κωφους ακουοντας και λαλουντας – N Σ ℓ 48, ℓ 49
  κωφους λαλουντας – א
15:31
  κυλλους υγιεις – B D
  omit – Sinaiticus 1 700 892

16:6
  αυτοις – B
  omit –א
16:9
  ουδε μνημονευετε – Β
  omit – א X
16:12
  της ζυμης των αρτων των Φαρισαιων και Σαδδουκαιων – א ff1 syrc
  της ζυμης των Φαρισαιων – 33
  της ζυμης των αρτων – א2 Β L 892 1009 1241
  των αρτων – f1
  της ζυμης του αρτου – C Κ W Χ Δ Π 28 700 1010 Byz c f q
  της ζυμης – D Θ f13 565 a b ff2 syrs
17:10
  οι μαθηται αυτου – Β
  οι μαθηται – א L Z W
17:15
  κυριε – Β
  omit –א
17:17
  αποκριθεις δε ο Ιησους – Β
  δε ο αποκριθεις –א
18:7
  ουαι τω ανθφωπω – א
  ουαι τω ανθφωπω εκεινω – Β
18:14
  εμπροσθεν του πατρος υμων – א Dc K L W X Δ Π f1 28 565
  εμπροσθεν του πατρος ημων – Dgr 1646 2148
  εμπροσθεν του πατρος μου – B Θ f13 33 700 892 1010 1216 1230 1241 1253 Byz
18:16
  δυο η τριων μαρτυρων – א Θ 700
  δυο μαρτυρων η τριων – B
  μαρτυρων δυο η τριων – L l
  δυο η τριων – D
19:7
  απολυται – א
  απολυται αυτην – Β
19:10
  λεγουσιν – א
  λεγουσιν αυτω – Β
19:12
  εισιν ευνοχοι – א
  εισιν γαρ ευνοχοι – Β
19:16
  ποιησας – א
  ποιησω ινα – Β
19:22
  ακουσας δε ο νεανισκος – א
  ακουσας δε ο νεανισκος τον λογον τουτον – Β
21:16
  εκ στοματος – א
  οτι εκ στοματος – Β
21:17
  εξω της πολεως – Β
  omit – א
21:19
  ευρεν – Β
  omit – א
21:28
  αμπελονι – א
  αμπελονι μου – Β
21:33
  ωρυξεν αυτω – א V 69
  ωρυξεν εν αυτω – Β
22:1
  παραβολαις αυτοις – א
  εν παραβολαις αυτοις – Β
22:11
  ειδεν ανθρωπον – א
  ειδεν εκει ανθρωπον – Β
22:40
  ολος – Β
  omit –א
23:3
  ποιησατε – א
  ποιησατε και τηρειτε – Β
23:8
 καθηγητης – Sinaiticus*, 2, Bezae, Regius, Koridethi, 1010, 1241, 1424, Byz, ℓ 292*
 διδασκαλος – Sinaiticus1, Vaticanus, 33, 892, ℓ 292cor
23:35
  αιμα – א
  παν αιμα – Β
23:35b
  υιου βαραχιου – Β
  omit –א
23:37
  η – Β
  omit –א
24:2
  ταυτα – א
  ταυτα παντα – Β
24:9
  υπο των εθνων – א
  υπο παντων των εθνων – Β
24:24
  σημεια και τερατα – א
  σημεια μεγαλα και τερατα – Β
24:26
  ουν – Β
  omit –א
24:30
  και κοψομται – א
  και τοτε κοψομται – Β
24:31
  σαλπιγγος μεγαλης – א
  σαλπιγγος φωνης μεγαλης – Β
24:35
  omit – א
  included – B
24:48
  ο κακος δουλος – א
  ο κακος δουλος εκεινος – Β
25:3
  λαμπαδας – א L
  λαμπαδας αυτων – Β
25:17
  ωσαυτως – א
  ωσαυτως και – Β
25:22
  κυριε – Β
  omit –א
26:33
  παντες – א
  ει παντες – Β
26:50
  ο δε – א
  ο δε Ιησους – Β
26:72
  οτι – Β
  omit – א
27:11
  εφη – א
  εφη αυτω – Β
27:33
  λεγομενον – Β
  omit –א
27:45
  επι πασαν την γην – Β
  omit –א
27:47
  οτι – Β
  omit –א
27:48
  εξ αυτων – Β
  omit – א
27:53
  εισηλθον –
  omit –א
27:59
  εν – Β
  omit –א
27:60
  αυτο – Β
  omit –א
28:5
  ταις γυναιξιν – Β
  omit –א
28:10
  μου – Β
  omit –א
28:15
  ημερας – Β
  omit – א
28:18
  αυτοις – Β
  omit –א

Gospel of Mark 

4:20
   εν... εν... εν... – א A C2 D
   εν... omit... omit... – B
6:43
   κλασματα δωδεκα κοφινων πληρωματα – 𝔓45 Β (L Δ) 892
   κλασματων δωδεκα κοφινους πληρεις – A D Θ Byz (syrh)
   περισσευματα κλασματων δωδεκα κοφινους πληρεις – (33) 1241 1424 it
   κλασματων δωδεκα κοφινων πληρωματα – א W (f1) f13 pc
10:19
   μη αποστεπησης – א A B2 C D X Θ 565 892 1009 1071 1195 1216 1230 1241 1253 1344 1365 1646 2174 Byz
   omit – B* K W Δ Π Ψ f1 f13 28 700 1010 1079 1242 1546 2148
10:40
   ητοιμασται υπο του πατρος μου –  א*, b, f1 1071 1241 ita, r1
   ητοιμασται παρα του πατρος μου – Θ
   ητοιμασται παρα του πατρος – ℓ 60
   ητοιμασται – majority of mss A B C K L W X Δ Π Ψ 0146 Byz

11:1
   εις Βηθφαγη και Βηθανιαν – Β
   εις Βηθφαγη και εις Βηθανιαν – א C Θ

11:3
   αυτον αποστελλει παλιν – א D L 892 1241 Lect (αποστελει copsa)
   αποστελλει παλιν αυτον – B
   παλιν αποστελλει αυτον – Θ
   αποστελλει παλιν – Δ
   αυτον αποστελλει – A K X (αποστελει W f1 700 copbo) f13 Byz
   αποστελλει αυτον – 1344 1365

11:7
   φερουσιν – א2 B L Δ Ψ 892
   αγουσιν – א* C W Θ f1 f13 28
   ηγαγον – A D 0133 Byz

Gospel of Luke 

Luke 2:37
   εβδομηκοντα – א
   ογδοηκοντα – Β majority of mss

Luke 8:3
 διηκονουν αυτοις (provided for them) – Β
 διηκονουν αυτω (provided for Him) – א

Luke 8:45
   Πετρος – 𝔓75 Β Π 700 1079 1546 syrc, s, pal copsa eth geo
   Πετρος και οι συν αυτω – א A C D L P W Θ Ξ f1 f13 33 892 1009 1071 1195 1230 1241 1253 Lect
   Πετρος και οι μετ’ αυτου – K X Δ Ψ 28 565 1000 1216 1242 1344 1365 1646 2148 2174 Byz

Luke 9:23
   αρνησασθω – א A Β2 D K L Θ Ξ f13 33
   απαρνησασθω – 𝔓75 Β* C R W Ψ f1 Byz

Gospel of John 

John 1:25
 και ηρω[τησαν] αυτον (and asked him) – 𝔓5
 και ειπον αυτω (and told him) – Sinaiticus
 και ηρωτησαν και ειπαν αυτω (and asked him and told him) – Vaticanus

John 1,33
 και εγω (and I) – Sinaiticus
 καγω (and I) – Vaticanus

John 1:34
 ο εκλεκτος (chosen one) – 𝔓5 Sinaiticus
 ο υιος (the son) – Vaticanus

See also 
 Textual variants in the New Testament

References

Further reading 

 Ezra Abbot, On the Comparative Antiquity of the Sinaitic and Vatican manuscripts of the Greek Bible (1872)
 Herman C. Hoskier, Codex B and its Allies, Bernard Quaritch, London 1914 (Volume 1, Volume 2).
 Bruce M. Metzger, A Textual Commentary on the Greek New Testament: A Companion Volume to the United Bible Societies' Greek New Testament, 1994, United Bible Societies, London & New York.

External links 
 The Codex Sinaiticus Project
 Recensio Codice Vaticano
 New Testament Transcript

Greek New Testament uncials
4th-century biblical manuscripts
Great uncial codices